Elton Gissendanner (born November 8, 1927) is a politician and lawyer in the American state of Florida. He served in the Florida House of Representatives from 1967 to 1968, representing the 107th district. From 1979 to 1987, he was executive director of the Florida Department of Natural Resources.

References

1927 births
Living people
Members of the Florida House of Representatives